Ericameria winwardii  is a rare North American species of flowering plants in the family Asteraceae. It has been found only on in two adjacent counties in the western United States: Lincoln County in Wyoming and Bear Lake County in Idaho.

Ericameria winwardii  is a branching shrub up to 20 cm (8 inches) tall. Leaves are elliptic or oblanceolate up to 15 mm (0.6 inches) long. It sometimes produces flower heads one at a time, sometimes in groups, each head with 4–9 disc florets but no ray florets.

References

External links
Photo of herbarium specimen at Missouri Botanical Garden, collected in Wyoming, isotype of Ericameria winwardii 

winwardii
Flora of Idaho
Flora of Wyoming
Endemic flora of the United States
Plants described in 2005
Flora without expected TNC conservation status